The Pensions Advisory Service (TPAS) was a non-departmental public body and independent non-profit company limited by guarantee in the United Kingdom, which provided free information, advice and guidance on state, company and individual pension schemes. Additionally they helped any member of the public who had a problem, complaint or dispute with their occupational or private pension arrangement.

The organisation was grant-aided by the Department for Work and Pensions. 

The service was provided by a nationwide network of volunteer advisers with the required knowledge and experience who were supported and augmented by a technical and administrative staff based in London.

In January 2019 the UK government launched the Money and Pensions Service, combining the Money Advice Service, the Pensions Advisory Service and Pension Wise to form a single financial guidance body. The decision to merge the organisations into one body was originally announced in March 2016 by HM Treasury and confirmed in the Queen's Speech of June 2017. In March 2021, MaPS announced that it would be consolidating its three legacy consumer brands into one brand called MoneyHelper, to provide a better and enhanced consumer experience and a single source of information and guidance.

References

External links

 Money and Pensions Service
 MoneyHelper

Non-departmental public bodies of the United Kingdom government
Department for Work and Pensions
Pensions in the United Kingdom
Private companies limited by guarantee of the United Kingdom